The tree pangolin (Phataginus tricuspis) is one of eight extant species of pangolins ("scaly anteaters"), and is native to equatorial Africa. Also known as the  white-bellied pangolin or three-cusped pangolin, it is the most common of the African forest pangolins.

Description
Phataginus tricuspis is a relatively small pangolin. Each dark brown to brownish yellow scale has three points, to which the specific name tricuspis refers. These scales cover the whole body besides the face, underbelly, and insides of the legs. The scales are made of keratin, as are human fingernails, and are anchored at the base to the pangolin's skin. The head is small, and the snout is elongated. The feet are short, and each foot has five long curved claws.

Taxonomy
The tree pangolin had belonged to the genus Manis and subgenus Phataginus before Phataginus was elevated to generic status. Two subspecies were recognized in 1972 by Meester:

P. t. tricuspis
P. t. mabirae
The tree pangolins, along with the Long-tailed pangolins, make up the genus Phataginus (the African Tree Pangolins). This makes Phataginus tetradactyla the closest relative to Phataginus tricuspis.

Range and habitat
The tree pangolin ranges from Guinea through Sierra Leone and much of West Africa to Central Africa as far east as extreme southwestern Kenya and northwestern Tanzania. To the south, it extends to northern Angola and northwestern Zambia. It has been found on the Atlantic island of Bioko, but no records confirm a presence in Senegal, Gambia, or Guinea-Bissau.

The tree pangolin is semiarboreal and generally nocturnal. It is found in lowland tropical moist forests (both primary and secondary), as well as savanna/forest mosaics. It probably adapts to some degree to habitat modification, such as commercial plantations, as it favours cultivated and fallow land where it is not aggressively hunted (e.g., abandoned or little-used oil palm trees in secondary growth).

Behavior

The tree pangolin can walk on all fours or on its hind legs using its prehensile tail for balance. It can climb up trees in the absence of branches. When walking on all fours, it walks on its front knuckles with its claws tucked underneath to protect them from wearing down. Its anal scent glands disperse a foul secretion much like a skunk when threatened. It has a well-developed sense of smell, but as a nocturnal animal, it has poor eyesight. Instead of teeth, it has a gizzard-like stomach full of stones and sand it ingests. The tree pangolin in Africa fills its stomach with air before entering water to aid in buoyancy for well-developed swimming.

The tree pangolin has many adaptations. When threatened, it rolls up into a ball ("volvation"), protecting itself with its thick skin and scales. Its scales cover its entire body except for the belly, snout, eyes, ears, and undersides of the limbs. When a mother with young is threatened, she rolls up around the young, which also roll into a ball.  While in a ball, she can extend her scales and make a cutting action by using muscles to move the scales back and forth.  She makes an aggressive huff noise when threatened, but that is the extent of her noise-making.

Diet
The tree pangolin eats insects such as ants and termites from their nests, or the armies of insects moving on the trees.  This form of diet is called myrmecophagy. It relies on its thick skin for protection, and digs into burrows with its long, clawed forefeet. It eats between 5 and 7 ounces (150 to 200 g) of insects a day.  The pangolin uses its 10- to 27-in (250- to 700-mm) tongue which is coated with gummy alkaline mucus to funnel the insects into its mouth.  The tongue is actually attached to the end of the xiphoid process of the sternum in the abdominal cavity.

Reproduction
Female pangolin territories are solitary and small, less than 10 acres (4 ha), and they rarely overlap.  Males have larger territories, up to 60 acres (24 ha), which overlap many female territories, resulting in male/female meetings. Pangolins can demonstrate their availability through feces and urine markings as well as by spreading the scent produced by their anal glands. The meetings between males and females are brief unless the female is in estrus, when mating occurs.  Gestation of young lasts 150 days, and one young per birth is normal.  The young pangolin cannot walk at birth so it is carried on its mother's tail. It is weaned after three months, but it remains with its mother for five months in total.  At first, the newborn's scales are soft, but, after a few days, they start to harden.

Use by humans
The tree pangolin is subject to widespread and often intensive exploitation for bushmeat and traditional medicine, and is by far the most common of the pangolins found in African bushmeat markets. Conservationists believe this species underwent a decline of 20–25% between 1993 and 2008 (three pangolin generations) due mainly to the impact of the bushmeat hunting. They assert it continues to be harvested at unsustainable levels in some of its range. Its conservation status has been progressively elevated over time, from "Least Concern" in 1996 to "Endangered" by 2019.

References

External links

 Manis (Phataginus) tricuspis at Mammal Species of the World, 3rd edition

tree pangolin
Vulnerable animals
Vulnerable biota of Africa
tree pangolin
tree pangolin
Species endangered by human consumption
Species endangered by human consumption for medicinal or magical purposes